Belo Pole (Bulgarian: Бело поле) is a village in north-western Bulgaria. It is located in the municipality of Ruzhintsi, Vidin Province.

As of December 2013 the village has a population of 726.

References
 http://www.guide-bulgaria.com/nw/vidin/rujintsi/belo_pole

Villages in Vidin Province